Zinnwaldite, KLiFeAl(AlSi3)O10(OH,F)2, potassium lithium iron aluminium silicate hydroxide fluoride is a silicate mineral in the mica group. The IMA status is as a series between siderophyllite (KFe2Al(Al2Si2)O10(F,OH)2) and polylithionite (KLi2AlSi4O10(F,OH)2) and not considered a valid mineral species.

Name and discovery
It was first described in 1845 in Zinnwald/Cinovec on the German-Czech Republic border.

Occurrence
It occurs in greisens, pegmatite, and quartz veins often associated with tin ore deposits. It is commonly associated with topaz, cassiterite, wolframite, lepidolite, spodumene, beryl, tourmaline, and fluorite.

References

Potassium minerals
Iron(II) minerals
Lithium minerals
Aluminium minerals
Monoclinic minerals
Minerals in space group 9
Mica group